Sajidul Islam (born 18 January 1988) is a Bangladeshi cricketer. He made his international cricket debut in 2008 against New Zealand. Sajid is a left-handed batsman and left arm medium fast bowler. He played for Bangladesh Under-17s in 2003/04 and represented the Bangladesh Cricket Board Academy in 2006/07. He made his debut for Barisal Division in 2005/06 and took an impressive 40 first-class wickets in his first two seasons in the game, with a best analysis of 5 for 61 against Dhaka Division.

Career 
In December 2007, he was called up to the Bangladesh squad on tour in New Zealand as a replacement for the injured Syed Rasel. On 4 January 2008 he made his Test debut, he took 2/71 which included taking a wicket with his second ball in Test cricket. In 2013, he made a successful return in the Test side when he played against Zimbabwe in Harare. In the 2012–13 season, Sajidul picked up 24 wickets for Rangpur Division which prompted his signing to the Sylhet Royals in the Bangladesh Premier League.

References

External links

Bangladesh Test cricketers
Bangladesh Twenty20 International cricketers
Bangladeshi cricketers
Barisal Division cricketers
Sylhet Strikers cricketers
Rangpur Division cricketers
Living people
1988 births
Fortune Barishal cricketers
Mohammedan Sporting Club cricketers
Gazi Group cricketers
Victoria Sporting Club cricketers
Bangladesh North Zone cricketers
Bangladesh Central Zone cricketers
People from Rangpur District